Alex Pierson (born October 17, 1971 in Hamilton, Ontario) is a Canadian broadcaster.

Biography
She began working in television in 1995 at CHCH-TV in Hamilton, and later became an employee of CKAL-TV in Calgary. A few years later she returned and began working at CKVR-TV in Barrie, followed by her joining CITY-TV in Toronto.

For a few years she was the co-anchor of Toronto's 11 p.m. CityNews with Mark Dailey, as well as a reporter for CityNews at Six and cp24. She left Citytv in September 2006. After a hiatus from television news, she returned and joined CIII-TV as a reporter. After 4 years reporting on courts and crime and anchoring the weekend news, Pierson left to take an anchor position with Sun News Network.

In 2011, the Sun News Network announced Pierson would be co-host of The Roundtable, the network's morning show, along with Pat Bolland and Andrea Slobodian. and subsequently hosted AM Agenda  and was host of Straight Talk until Sun News Network closed in early 2015.

Pierson currently works as a radio personality on Global News Radio 640 Toronto as host of her own evening talk radio show, "ON Point with Alex Pierson" which is also syndicated for broadcast on Global News Radio 980 CFPL in London, Ontario & Global News Radio 900 CHML in Hamilton, Ontario.

References

External links
GlobalNews bio page
ON Point with Alex Pierson (Blog & Podcast page)

1971 births
Living people
Canadian television news anchors
People from Hamilton, Ontario
Canadian women television journalists
Canadian talk radio hosts
Canadian bloggers
Canadian women radio hosts
Canadian women bloggers